Mangun (also Romanized as Mangūn; also known as Mangān and Menjān) is a village in Kamfiruz-e Jonubi Rural District, Kamfiruz District, Marvdasht County, Fars Province, Iran. At the 2006 census, its population was 720, in 151 families.

References 

Populated places in Marvdasht County